Arkadium is a founder-led  creator of casual games for adults.  Its games can be found on its own owned-and-operated site, Arkadium.com, as well as across a network of digital publishers including USA Today and the Washington Post. The company is headquartered in New York City with an additional office in Krasnodar, Russia.

History 
Husband-and-wife team Kenny Rosenblatt and Jessica Rovello founded Arkadium in 2001, inspired by a game of Ms. Pac-Man. Arkadium developed the Microsoft Solitaire Collection in 2011 as well as the modern iteration of Minesweeper.

In 2014, after the Russian annexation of the Crimea, the US put sanctions on companies operating there. Arkadium had a 100-person team in Crimea, which was reduced to 50 and relocated from that region.

In January 2017, the company announced it signed 300 new publishers in 2016 and saw record growth, and in 2019 announced a partnership with Sportradar to make it easy to bet on sports trivia questions to make web-based content more interactive and engaging for fans.

In September 2018, Arkadium used its profits to buy out the investors, allowing the company to remain independent and grow on its own terms. CEO Jessica Rovello said she had no regrets about stepping off the venture-funded path. Arkadium games were played 830 million times in 2018.

Corporate affairs

Leadership 
Arkadium is managed by CEO and Co-Founder Rosenblatt and President and Co-Founder Rovello. Other key executives are:

 Tom Rassweiler, SVP Product
 Greg Gallo, SVP Operations
 Neal Sinno, Chief Partnership Officer
 Vivian Lee, SVP People Innovation

Customer and revenue 

The company reaches over 500 million users each month across Windows, iOS, and Android.  Its games include the Microsoft Solitaire Collection which comes loaded on Windows 10, Windows 8, and mobile devices. In March, 2017, the company released InHabit, which creates interactive visualizations called factives; these are automatically embedded into articles and are intended to increase session duration and user engagement.

Awards 
Arkadium was named one of 14 New York Tech Companies to watch in 2016 by Forbes, and 'Best Workplace' by Inc. Magazine in its 2016 and 2017 issues.  The company was named by Digiday as Employer of the Year, Tech platform category, in 2017, Crain's 100 Best Places to Work in New York City in 2017, and number 27 in AdAge's Best Places to Work in 2017. In 2019, Arkadium was named 'Best Workplace by Inc. Magazine, and the company's InHabit product, in conjunction with Spark Foundry and NBA, was named a Digiday Publishing Awards winner in the 'Best Custom Advertising' category for a 2018-19 NBA Tip Off campaign. In 2020, the company was certified as a Great Place to Work, as well as won an award for Best Place to Work by the Business Intelligence Group. In December 2019, Forbes featured Arkadium's HR and hiring practices.

Developed video games

References

External links

Mass media companies of the United States